Kincardineshire, also known as the Mearns (from the Scottish Gaelic  meaning "the Stewartry"), is a historic county, registration county and lieutenancy area on the coast of northeast Scotland. It is bounded by Aberdeenshire on the north and west, and by Angus on the south.

The name "Kincardine" is also used in Kincardine and Mearns, a committee area of the Aberdeenshire Council, although this covers a smaller area than the county.

History

Anciently, the area was the Province of Mearns, bordered on the north by Marr, and on the west by Angus. The name of the province simply refers to its status; the more important provinces were governed by a great steward (Mormaer), while the less important ones were governed by a mere steward (Maer).

It included the burghs of Stonehaven, Banchory, Inverbervie and Laurencekirk, and other settlements included Drumoak, Muchalls, Newtonhill and Portlethen. Mearns extended to Hill of Fare north of the River Dee, but in 1891 the Royal Burgh of Torry (on the south bank of the Dee) was incorporated into Aberdeenshire.

The introduction of sheriffs in the 11th century created a parallel authority over the area, based at the town of Kincardine. The town of Kincardine was not, as many believe, the village of Kincardine O'Neil (which was actually in Marr), nor was it the Kincardine in Fife. The Kincardine in question is in fact a place that ceased to exist during the Middle Ages, its only visible remnant being the ruin of Kincardine Castle, 2 miles northeast of Fettercairn, near the hamlet of Phesdo.

In 1296, King John Balliol wrote a letter of surrender from the castle to Edward I of England after a short war that marked the beginning of the Wars of Scottish Independence. In 1600, the Estates of Parliament ordered the shrieval governance of Kincardineshire to be conducted at the Stonehaven Tolbooth.

In the mid-19th century, local government reforms replaced the ancient provinces by new Counties (shires), aligned to sheriffdom boundaries; hence, Mearns became Kincardineshire. The Local Government (Scotland) Act 1889 established a uniform system of county councils in Scotland and realigned the boundaries of many of Scotland's counties. Subsequently, Kincardineshire County Council was created in 1890. Kincardine County Council held its meetings at County Buildings in Stonehaven. There were additional offices at 33 Evan Street in Stonehaven from around 1920. 

The county lost its administrative status in 1975. The area of Nigg in the north of the county became part of the City of Aberdeen, and the remainder of the county became part of the Kincardine and Deeside district of the Grampian region. When the Grampian region was divided into unitary council areas in 1996, the district was absorbed into the Aberdeenshire council area.

Geography

Roughly triangular in shape, Kincardineshire consists of the largely flat Strathmore area running parallel with the coast, with hillier, forested country in the interior, the latter forming part of the Grampian Mountains. The highest point is Mount Battock at 778 m (2,552 ft), lying on the border with Angus.

Rivers
Among the rivers are Cowie Water, Carron Water, Luther Water, Burn of Muchalls, Burn of Pheppie, Burn of Elsick, Burn of Monboys, Bervie Water and the lower reaches of the River Dee.

Structures and sites
Allardice Castle
Cowie Castle (ruins)
Catterline
Dunnottar Castle
Fetteresso Castle
Fowlsheugh Nature Reserve
Lewis Grassic Gibbon Centre, Arbuthnott
Muchalls Castle
Portlethen Moss
Stonehaven Tolbooth
Ury House

Coat of arms 
The county's coat of arms displayed and reflected the history of the Honours of Scotland, which were kept at Dunnottar Castle and later at Kinneff, both within the historical boundaries of the county, during the Wars of the Three Kingdoms. It was: Gules, the Sceptre and Sword of Scotland crosswise in saltire, with the Crown of Scotland in chief and a ruined castle on a mound in base, all or. It was originally the motto of the Viscounts of Arbuthnott, whose seat is in the county, and the 14th Viscount was Lord Lieutenant of Kincardine at the time of the arms' matriculation by the Lord Lyon in 1927.

Constituency 

There was a Kincardineshire constituency of the House of Commons of the Parliament of Great Britain from 1708 to 1801 and of the Parliament of the United Kingdom from 1801 to 1918, representing the county of Kincardineshire, minus the parliamentary burgh of Inverbervie. Inverbervie was a component of the Aberdeen District of Burghs from 1708 to 1832 and of the Montrose District of Burghs from 1832 to 1950.

In 1918 the Kincardineshire constituency was merged with part of the Western Aberdeenshire constituency to form the Kincardine and Western Aberdeenshire constituency.

In 1950 Kincardine and Western Aberdeenshire was divided between the West Aberdeenshire constituency and the North Angus and Mearns constituency. North Angus and Mearns then covered the whole of the county of Kincardineshire, including the former parliamentary burgh of Inverbervie, and part of the county of Angus, the latter being previously within the Forfarshire constituency.

In 1983, eight years after the abolition of the local government county of Kincardineshire, North Angus and Mearns was replaced by new constituencies.

The county currently makes up part of the West Aberdeenshire and Kincardine constituency of the House of Commons.

Transport

Rail

The Edinburgh-Aberdeen railway line runs parallel to the coast and through the towns of Laurencekirk, Stonehaven and Portlethen.

Historic transport routes
The ancient Causey Mounth road was built on high ground to make passable this only available medieval route from coastal points south to Aberdeen. This ancient passage specifically connected the Bridge of Dee to Muchalls Castle, Cowie Castle (and effectively Dunnottar Castle). The route was that taken by the Earl Marischal and Marquess of Montrose when they led a Covenanter army of 9,000 men in the first battle of the Bishops' Wars in 1639.

Elsick Mounth is a prehistoric trackway used by the Caledonian tribes as well as the Roman army in their northern invasion of the Scottish Highlands.

Settlements

Altens
Arbuthnott
Auchenblae
Balnagask
Banchory
Bridge of Muchalls
Cammachmore
Catterline
Chapelton of Elsick
Cookney
Cove Bay
Crawton
Downies
Drumlithie
Edzell Woods
Fettercairn
Findon
Fordoun
Glenbervie
Gourdon
Inverbervie
Johnshaven
Kincorth
Kinneff
Kirkton of Durris
Laurencekirk
Luthermuir
Maryculter
Marykirk
Muchalls
Netherley
Newtonhill
Nigg
Old Portlethen
Portlethen
St Cyrus
Stonehaven
Tewel
Torry
Tullos

Notable people
The author Lewis Grassic Gibbon, born James Leslie Mitchell, was a Scottish writer. His Sunset Song is one of the best-known Scottish novels of the 20th century. It was voted Scotland's favourite book in a poll announced at the 2005 Edinburgh International Book Festival. Set in a fictional village in the Mearns, the book draws heavily from Mitchell's upbringing in Arbuthnott. One of the key features of the book, and some of his other writing, is the balanced and immersive use of the local Doric Scots dialect mixed with standard English, in a manner easily and enjoyably accessible to someone unfamiliar with the North East of Scotland.
 See also :Category:People from Kincardine and Mearns

Notable residents
Richard Henry Brunton, born in Kincardine
Cosmo Innes born in Durris Castle
Hercules Linton (1837–1900), born in Inverbervie, designer of the Cutty Sark
James Murdoch, born in Stonehaven
James Taylor (tea planter) born on the Monboddo estate, Laurencekirk
Robert William Thomson born in Stonehaven

See also
List of counties of Scotland 1890–1975
Kincardine (disambiguation)

References

External links

Historic map showing the Mearns by H. Moll (d. 1732)
Interactive map of modern Kincardineshire

 
Former counties of Scotland
Lieutenancy areas of Scotland
Counties of the United Kingdom (1801–1922)